HMS Tyne is a  built by Vosper Thornycroft in Southampton for the Royal Navy to serve as a fishery protection unit within the United Kingdom's waters along with her two sister ships  and . All three were commissioned into service in 2003 to replace the five older s.

Tyne is the sixth Royal Navy ship to carry the name and was featured in the first episode of the BBC series Empire of the Seas, "How the Navy Forged the Modern World, Heart of Oak", presented by Dan Snow.

Construction
The first of her class, Tyne was built by Vosper Thornycroft at its Woolston, Southampton shipyard in 2001. Following construction, she was launched on 1 July 2002 with an expected handover to the Royal Navy's Fishery Protection Squadron by November. By January 2003, she had completed the first stage of her sea trials in the Solent.

The first three River-class ships Tyne, Severn and Mersey were the first ever privately funded vessels received by the Royal Navy on charter. They were chartered for five years, after which the Ministry of Defence could either purchase them outright or return them to VT.

Operational history
Tyne made her first operational fishery protection patrol between January and February 2003.

In September 2012, the Royal Navy purchased Tyne and her sister ships Severn and Mersey, having previously operated them on lease. They had a remaining service life of 11 years.

Aside from her day-to-day fishery protection duties, Tyne has occasionally been called upon to undertake escort roles in the UK Area of Interest. Two such examples occurred in the autumn of 2016 when she was twice assigned to escort Russian warships through the English Channel.

In March 2017, it was announced that Tyne would be manned by personnel usually assigned to s to allow her crew to transfer to the Batch 2 River-class  in build in Glasgow.

Decommissioning and reactivation
In March 2018, Parliamentary Under-Secretary for Defence Guto Bebb revealed that £12.7M had been allocated from the EU Exit Preparedness Fund to preserve Tyne and her two Batch 1 sister ships, should they be required to control and enforce UK waters and fisheries following the United Kingdom's withdrawal from the European Union. In May 2018, the ship entered Portsmouth ahead of her pre-planned decommissioning, which was to take place on 24 May 2018. However, by July 2018, the ship was reportedly still flying the white ensign and therefore still in active service. The Royal Navy subsequently clarified that a formal decommissioning ceremony had not taken place, confirming the ship was still commissioned, due to delays in the delivery of the ship's planned successor, HMS Forth. On 22 November 2018, Defence Secretary Gavin Williamson further clarified that Tyne and her two Batch 1 sister ships would be retained in service and forward-operated from their affiliated rivers. However, the idea of forward basing the Batch 1s was reportedly later abandoned. The ships are now to be retained in service until around 2028.

Post-reactivation

Despite plans to station Tyne on her affiliated river, the ship remained base ported in Portsmouth as of February 2020. Between 1 January 2014 and 30 September 2019, she had spent a total of 1,081 days at sea. In December, she was tasked with shadowing the Russian Navy  Perekop through the English Channel.

Affiliations
Her affiliations included North Tyneside Council, St Catherines Primary School, Hadrian Special Needs Primary School, TS Caledonia (Peterhead Sea Cadets unit), TS Tyne (Newburn Sea Cadets unit), and the Worshipful Company of Butchers.

References

External links

 

River-class patrol vessels
Ships built in Southampton
2003 ships
Ships of the Fishery Protection Squadron of the United Kingdom